Pseudochromis melanurus, the black-tail dottyback, is a species of ray-finned fish from Tonga and Fiji in the Pacific Ocean, which is a member of the family Pseudochromidae.

References

Gill, A.C., 2004. Revision of the Indo-Pacific dottyback fish subfamily Pseudochrominae (Perciformes: Pseudochromidae). Smith. Monogr. (1):1-213.

melanurus
Taxa named by Anthony C. Gill
Fish described in 2004